As I Call You Down is the debut album by American rock supergroup Fistful of Mercy, released on October 5, 2010.

Track listing

Personnel
Dhani Harrison - lead, harmony, and backing vocals, acoustic guitar, electric guitar, bass guitar, keyboards
Ben Harper - lead, harmony, and backing vocals, acoustic guitar, electric guitar, slide guitar
Joseph Arthur - lead, harmony, and backing vocals, acoustic guitar, electric guitar, bass guitar, keyboards
Jim Keltner - drums
Jessy Greene - violin

References

2010 debut albums
Fistful of Mercy albums
Albums produced by Ben Harper